Simon Critchley (born 27 February 1960) is an English philosopher and the Hans Jonas Professor of Philosophy at the New School for Social Research in New York, USA.

Challenging the ancient tradition that philosophy begins in wonder, Critchley argues that philosophy begins in disappointment.  Two particular forms of disappointment inform Critchley's work: religious and political disappointment.  While religious disappointment arises from a lack of faith and generates the problem of what is the meaning of life in the face of nihilism, political disappointment comes from the violent world we live in and raises the question of justice in a violently unjust world. In addition, to these two regions of research, Critchley's recent works have engaged in more experimental forms of writing on Shakespeare, David Bowie, suicide, Greek tragedy and association football.

Biography

Simon Critchley was born on 27 February 1960, in Letchworth Garden City, England, to a working-class family originally from Liverpool.  He is a fan of Liverpool Football Club and has said that, it ‘may be the governing passion of my life. My only religious commitment is to Liverpool Football Club.’ In grammar school, he studied history, sciences, languages (French and Russian) and English literature.  During this time, he developed a lifelong interest in ancient history.  After intentionally failing his school exams, Critchley worked a number of odd jobs, including in a pharmaceutical factory in which he sustained a severe injury to his left hand.  During this time, he was a participant in the emerging Punk scene in England, playing in numerous bands that all failed. While the music failed, there was a silver lining to the experience: a newfound love for Chinese food, inspired by Warren Zevon. 

After studying for remedial 'O' and 'A' level exams at a community college while doing other odd jobs, Critchley went to university aged 22. He went to the University of Essex to study literature, but switched to philosophy.  Amongst his teachers were Jay Bernstein, Robert Bernasconi, Ludmilla Jordanova, Onora O’Neill, Frank Cioffi, Mike Weston, Roger Moss, and Gabriel Pearson.  He also briefly participated in the Communist Students' Society (where he first read Althusser, Foucault, and Derrida) as well as the Poetry Society.  After graduating with First Class Honours and winning the Kanani Prize in Philosophy in 1985, Critchley went to the University of Nice, where he wrote his M.Phil. on overcoming metaphysics in Heidegger and Carnap with Dominique Janicaud.  His other teachers were Clement Rosset and André Tosel.  In 1987, Critchley returned to the University of Essex to write his PhD, completed in 1988, which was to become the basis for The Ethics of Deconstruction.

Critchley became a university fellow at University College Cardiff in 1988.  In 1989, he returned to the University of Essex as lecturer and where he would become reader in 1995 and full professor in 1999.  During this time he serviced first as deputy director (1990–96) and then as director (1997–2003) of the Centre for Theoretical Studies in the Humanities and Social Sciences.  From 1998 to 2004, he was Directeur de Programme, College International de Philosophie.  He has held visiting appointments at Johann Wolfgang Goethe Universität (1997–98, 2001), University of Nijmegen (1997), University of Sydney (2000), University of Notre Dame (2002), Cardozo Law School (2005), University of Oslo (2006) and University of Texas (2010).  From 2009 to 2015, he ran a summer school at University of Tilburg.  He is also a professor of philosophy at the European Graduate School. Since 2004, Critchley has been professor of philosophy at the New School for Social Research in New York, at which he became the Hans Jonas Professor of Philosophy in 2011.  Since 2015, he has served on the board of the Onassis Foundation. In 2021, Critchley was named by Academic Influence as one of the top 25 most influential philosophers of today. He discusses his biography in a recent episode of Time Sensitive.

Overview of philosophical work

The Ethics of Deconstruction: Derrida and Levinas (1st ed., Blackwell, 1992; 2nd ed., Edinburgh University Press 1999; 3rd ed., EUP 2014)

Since its original publication in 1992, The Ethics of Deconstruction has been an acclaimed work.  Against the received understanding of Derrida as either a metaphysician with his own ‘infrastructure’ or as a value-free nihilist, Critchley argues that central to Derrida's thinking is a conception of ethical experience.  Specifically, this conception of ethical experience must be understood in Levinasian terms in which the other calls into question one's ego, self-consciousness, and ordinary comprehension.  Critchley argues that this Levinasian conception of ethical experience informs Derrida's deconstruction and develops the idea of clôtural reading.

Very Little ... Almost Nothing: Death, Philosophy, Literature (Routledge, 1997/2nd expanded ed., Routledge 2004)

Critchley's second monograph begins from the problem of religious disappointment, which generates the question of the meaning of life.  Through a long preamble on nihilism, Critchley rejects the view that an affirmation of finitude can redeem the meaning of life.  Instead, he argues that the ultimate mark of human finitude is that we cannot find meaning for the finite.  Rather, for Critchley, an adequate response to nihilism consists in seeing meaninglessness as a task or achievement.  Critchley then develops this thesis through discussions of Blanchot, Levinas, Cavell, German Romanticism, Adorno, Derrida, Beckett, and Wallace Stevens.

Ethics-Politics-Subjectivity: Essays on Derrida, Levinas, & Contemporary French Thought (Verso, 1999)

This collection brings together a number of previously published essays.  Amongst these essays, Critchley discusses a variety of historical and contemporary figures (e.g., Hegel, Heidegger, Jean Genet, Derrida, Levinas, Richard Rorty, Laclau, Lacan, Jean-Luc Nancy, and Blanchot) as well as topics (e.g., politics, subjectivity, race (human categorization) in the Western philosophical canon, psychoanalysis, comedy, friendship, and others).

Continental Philosophy: A Very Short Introduction (Oxford University Press, 2001)

Critchley's Continental Philosophy: A Very Short Introduction sets out to establish three claims: (1) to demonstrate why Continental philosophy is a contested concept by looking at the history and meaning of the term as well as its relationship to analytic or Anglo-American philosophy; (2) to show how it can be understood as a distinct set of philosophical traditions that cover a range of problems; and (3) to argue that a more promising future for philosophy is to talk about philosophy as such without such professional squabbles between Continental and Anglo-American philosophy.  Critchley defends these claims through discussions of such figures as Kant, Fichte, Hegel, Nietzsche, Husserl, Heidegger, Carnap, and others as well as such topics as the relationship between knowledge and wisdom, literature, science, politics, and nihilism.

On Humour (Routledge, 2002)

In On Humour, Critchley explores the central yet peculiar role that humour, jokes, laughter, and smiling play in human life.  Specifically, he defends the two-fold claim that humour both (1) engages our shared practices and mutual attunement with one another, while also (2) challenging those very social practices and sensibilities, showing how they might be transformed and become otherwise than they presently are.

Things Merely Are: Philosophy in the poetry of Wallace Stevens    (Routledge, 2005)

In Things Merely Are, Critchley argues for two claims: (1) that Wallace Stevens's poetry affords significant and illuminating philosophical insights and (2) that the best way to express such insights is poetically.  Specifically, Critchley argues that Stevens's poetry offers readers a novel take on the relationship between mind, language and material things, which overcomes modern epistemology. The book also offers an extended engagement with the cinema of Terrence Malick.

Infinitely Demanding: Ethics of Commitment, Politics of Resistance   (Verso, 2007)

Addressing the topic of political disappointment, Critchley argues for a conception of ethical experience and subjectivity.  Challenging the modern Kantian association of ethics and autonomy, Critchley argues for a ‘hetero-affective’ conception of ethical experience in which the subject is split between herself and a moral demand, which she experiences and yet cannot entirely fulfill. From this picture, Critchley develops an account of the experience of conscience before reflecting on the relationship between one's conscience and political action. The book argues for an ethical informed neo-anarchism.

The Book of Dead Philosophers   (Granta Books, 2008 and Vintage, 2009)

The Book of Dead Philosophers begins from the assumption that contemporary human life is not defined by a fear of death, but a terror of annihilation and what awaits us after death.  Rejecting any escape from our death in either mindless accumulation of wealth or a metaphysical sanctuary, Critchley follows Cicero in exploring the view that ‘to philosophize is to learn how to die’.  To that end, Critchley discusses the deaths (and lives) of philosophers ranging from Thales and Plato to Confucius and Avicenna (Ibn Sina), from Princess Elizabeth of Bohemia and Hegel to Heidegger and Frantz Fanon.

On Heidegger's Being and Time   (Routledge, 2008)

On Heidegger's Being and Time presents two ways of approaching Heidegger's text. Reiner Schürmann’s contribution reads Heidegger ‘backward’ from the later work to the earlier Being and Time.  Alternatively, Critchley reads Heidegger ‘forward’ through Heidegger's inheritance of phenomenology.  In his contribution, Critchley goes on to question the Heidegger's conception of inauthentic/authentic.

How to Stop Living and Start Worrying: Conversations with Carl Cederström  (Polity, 2010)

How to Stop Living and Start Worrying consists of a series of interviews between Critchley and Carl Cederström based on a Swedish TV series.  Here Critchley discusses his life and work through the themes of life, philosophy, death, love, humour, and authenticity.

Impossible Objects  (Polity, 2012)

Impossible Objects is a series of interviews between Critchley conducted between 2000 and 2011.  Critchley discusses his own work and development through a variety of topics (e.g., deconstruction, nihilism, politics, the literary, punk, tragedy, and more).

The Faith of the Faithless: Experiments in Political Theology  (Verso, 2012)

In The Faith of the Faithless, Critchley rethinks faith as a political concept without succumbing to the temptations of the atheistic dismissal of faith or the theistic embrace of faith.  To that end, Critchley discusses Rousseau, Badiou, St. Paul, Heidegger, and others.  He also defends his view of nonviolence from Zizek’s criticism.

Stay, Illusion! The Hamlet Doctrine  (Pantheon, 2013)

Co-authored with Jamieson Webster, Stay, Illusion! draws on various readings of Hamlet (e.g., Carl Schmitt, Walter Benjamin, Hegel, Freud, Lacan, and Nietzsche) with the aim of using this collection of interpretations to offer a close and compelling reading of Hamlet.

The Problem with Levinas  (Oxford University Press, 2015)

Through four lectures, Critchley reflects on five questions concerning Levinas: (1) what method might we follow in reading Levinas?; (2) what is Levinas’ fundamental problem?; (3) what is the shape of that problem in his early writings?; (4) what is Levinas’ answer to that problem?; and (5) is Levinas’ answer the best available answer? The book attempts to give a heterodox reading of Levinas's work and a new understanding of its importance.

ABC Of Impossibility  (Univocal, 2015)

ABC of Impossibility consists of fragments from an allegedly abandoned work, which largely date from 2004 to 2006.  The initial project was to develop a theory of impossible objects that would take the form of alphabetized entries.  These entries would deal with various phenomena, concepts, qualities, places, sensations, persons and moods.

Bowie  (OR Books, 2014; Expanded Edition – Serpent’s Tail, 2016)

In Bowie, Critchley discusses the influence David Bowie’s music has had on him throughout his life as well as reflects on the philosophical depth of Bowie's work. It is very much a fan's book that attempts to confer the appropriate aesthetic dignity on Bowie's work through a careful analysis of his lyrics and the exploration of themes of inauthenticity, isolation, truth and the longing for love.

Memory Theatre  (Fitzcarraldo, 2014)

Memory Theatre is a semi-fictional autobiographical story about the art of memory inspired by the work of Frances Yates and Adolfo Bioy Casares, but at its core is a concern with memory in relation to Hegel’s Phenomenology of Spirit. It is concerned with the building of a memory theatre, the delusive attempt to control one's relation to mortality and the progressive dismantling of the standard image of the philosopher.

Notes on Suicide   (Fitzcarraldo, 2015)

Against the prevailing tendency to either moralize against suicide or glorified self-murder, Critchley defends suicide as a phenomenon that should be thought about seriously and soberly.  To that end, Critchley examines numerous suicides and reflects on the increase of suicide in our society.

What We Think When We Think About Football  (Profile Books/Penguin, 2017)

Critchley argues that football occupies a particular place in society in that it at once originates from sociality and solidarity (e.g., that many teams formed from local churches or various community groups; the relation between a team and fans), while also being completely consumed by money, capital, and the dissolution and alienation of social life. It is an attempt to write a poetics of football.

Tragedy, the Greeks, and Us  (Pantheon/Profile Books, 2019)

In Tragedy, the Greeks, and Us, Critchley argues that tragedy articulates a philosophical orientation that challenges the traditional authority of philosophy by giving voice to what is contradictory, constricting, and limiting about human beings.  In developing tragedy's philosophy, he turns to the ancient sophist Gorgias and the sophistical practice of antilogia, which examines both sides of an issue so as to make the weaker argument appear stronger.  In addition to Gorgias, Critchley discusses Aeschylus, Sophocles, Euripides, Plato, Aristotle, and others.

Apply-degger (Onasis Foundation, 2020)

Apply-degger is a long-form, deep dive into the most important philosophical book of the last 100 years. Each episode of this podcast series will present one of the key concepts in Heidegger's philosophy. Taken together, the episodes will lay out the entirety of Heidegger project for people who are curious, serious and interested, but who simply don't have the time to sit down and read the 437 densely-written pages of the book. It is our hope that this series will show how Heidegger's thinking might be applied to one's life in ways which are illuminating, elevating and beneficial. Apply-degger is available for free as an audiobook on the Onasis Youtube channel as well as iTunes, Stitcher, and Spotify.

Bald: 35 Philosophical Short Cuts (Yale University Press, 2021)

This volume brings together thirty-five essays, originally published in The New York Times, on a wide range of topics, from the dimensions of Plato's academy and the mysteries of Eleusis to Philip K. Dick, Mormonism, money, and the joy and pain of Liverpool Football Club fans.

Other work

The Stone: Since 2010, Critchley has moderated The Stone in The New York Times, writing many essays himself.  Contributions have included such thinkers as Linda Martín Alcoff, Seyla Benhabib, Gary Gutting, Philip Kitcher, Chris Lebron, Todd May, Jason Stanley, Peter Singer, and many others.  The forum has been extremely popular and generated two collections of essays, co-edited by Critchley and Peter Catapano: The Stone Reader: Modern Philosophy in 133 Arguments (W.W. Norton & Co., 2015), The Stone Reader: Modern Ethics in 77 Arguments (W.W. Norton & Co., 2017), and Question Everything: A Stone Reader (W.W. Norton & Co., 2022).

International Necronautical Society (INS): Together with writer Tom McCarthy, Critchley is a founding member of the INS and serves as Head Philosopher. In its founding manifesto (1999), the First Committee of the INS declared (1) that death is a space, which INS intends to explore and inhabit; (2) that there is no beauty without death; (3) that the task of INS is to bring death out into the world; and (4) that the chief aim is to construct a means of conveying us into death.  The founding manifesto as well as a number of other documents can be found in The Mattering of Matter: Documents from the Archive of the International Necronautical Society (2013).

Critchley and Simmons: Critchley is a part of the band Critchley and Simmons with John Simmons.  They have released four albums: Humiliation (2004); The Majesty of the Absurd (2014); Ponders End (2017); and Moderate or Good, Occasionally Poor (2017).  Their music is available on Spotify, iTunes, and SoundCloud.

Guardian Commentary on Heidegger's Being and Time: In 2009, Critchley wrote a series of articles for The Guardian.

Debate with Slavoj Zizek: Critchley engaged in a public debate with Zizek.  In response to Infinitely Demanding (2007), Zizek's review (London Review of Books, 2007) challenged Critchley's argument that a politics of resistance should not reproduce the violent sovereignty such a politics opposes.  Critchley responded to Zizek's objection in Naked Punch and his own The Faith of the Faithless (2012).

Bibliography
 (1992, 1999, 2014) The Ethics of Deconstruction: Derrida and Levinas, Edinburgh: Edinburgh University Press. 
 (1997) Very Little... Almost Nothing: Death, Philosophy, Literature, Routledge, London & New York (2nd Edition, 2004). 
 (1999) Ethics-Politics-Subjectivity: Essays on Derrida, Levinas, and Contemporary French Thought, Verso, London (Reissued, 2007). 
 (2001) Continental Philosophy: A Very Short Introduction, Oxford University Press. 
 (2002) On Humour, Routledge, London .
 (2005) On the Human Condition, with Dominique Janicaud & Eileen Brennan, Routledge, London. 
 (2005) Things Merely Are: Philosophy in the Poetry of Wallace Stevens, Routledge, London. 
 (2007) Infinitely Demanding. Ethics of Commitment, Politics of Resistance, Verso, London & New York. 
 (2008) The Book of Dead Philosophers, Granta Books, London; Vintage, New York; Melbourne University Press, Melbourne. 
 (2008) On Heidegger’s ‘Being and Time’, with Reiner Schürmann, edited by Steven Levine, Routledge, London and New York. 
 (2008) Der Katechismus des Bürgers, Diaphanes Verlag, Berlin. 
 (2008) Democracy and Disappointment: On the Politics of Resistance (DVD) – Alain Badiou and Simon Critchley in Conversation, Slought Books, Philadelphia ASIN: B001AXTZIO
 (2010) How to Stop Living and Start Worrying, Polity Press .
 (2011) Impossible Objects, Polity Press .
 (2011) International Necronautical Society: Offizielle Mitteilungen
 (2012) The Mattering of Matter. Documents from the Archive of the International Necronautical Society, with Tom McCarthy, Sternberg Press, Berlin. 
 (2012) The Faith of the Faithless, Verso. 
 (2013) Stay, Illusion! The Hamlet Doctrine, Pantheon (North America); Verso (Europe). 
 (2014) Memory Theatre, Fitzcarraldo Editions (UK). 
 (2014) Bowie, OR Books. 
 (2015) Suicide, Thought Catalog/Kindle Single. ASIN: B00YB0UZDC
 (2015) Notes on Suicide, Fitzcarraldo Editions (UK). 
 (2015) The Problem With Levinas, Oxford University Press. 
 (2015) ABC of Impossibility, Univocal. 
 (2017) What We Think About When We Think About Football, Profile Books. 
 (2019) Tragedy, the Greeks, and Us, Pantheon Press (US), Profile Books (UK).  
 (2020) Apply-degger (Audio Book; available free Onasis Youtube channel, iTunes, Stitcher, and Spotify)
 (2021) Bald: 35 Philosophical Short Cuts, Yale University Press ISBN 978-0300255966

As (co)editor
 (1991) Re-Reading Levinas, ed. with Robert Bernasconi, Indiana University Press, Bloomington. 
 (1996) Deconstructive Subjectivities, ed. with Peter Dews, State University of New York Press, Ithaca, NY. 
 (1996) Emmanuel Levinas: Basic Philosophical Writings, ed. with Adriaan T. Peperzak and Robert Bernasconi, Indiana University Press, Bloomington. 
 (1998) A Companion to Continental Philosophy, ed. with William R. Schroeder, Blackwell Publishing, Oxford. 
 (2002) The Cambridge Companion to Levinas, ed. with Robert Bernasconi, Cambridge University Press. 
 (2004) Laclau: A Critical Reader, ed. with Oliver Marchart, Routledge, London. 
 (2014) The Anarchist Turn, eds. Jacob Blumenfeld and Chiara Bottici, Pluto Books. 
 (2017) The Stone Reader: Modern Philosophy in 133 Arguments, ed. with Peter Catapano, W.W. Norton & Co. 
 (2017) Modern Ethics in 77 Arguments, ed. with Peter Catapano, W.W. Norton & Co. 
 (2022) Question Everything: A Stone Reader, ed. with Peter Catapano, W.W. Norton & Co.

References

External links
 SimonCritchley.org – Website with interviews, reviews, bibliography of work etc.
 

1960 births
Living people
English anarchists
English atheists
21st-century English philosophers
Academics of the University of Essex
The New School faculty
Academic staff of European Graduate School
Continental philosophers
Philosophers of religion
Political philosophers
Philosophers of nihilism
Levinas scholars
20th-century English philosophers